Ali Moeen  (born 20 November 1968) is a Pakistani playwright and a lyricist.

Early life and career
Ali Moeen was born 20 November 1968 in Lahore. He completed his masters degree in English literature and political science from Government College University, Lahore.

On 2 December 2008, Ali Moeen was awarded the Best Drama Writer of Pakistan in the Hum TV's HUM Tele Film Festival 2008 for the telefilm Aik Aadh Hafta.

"Yeh Hum Naheen" (Urdu ﻳﻪ ﮨﻢ ﻧﹷﮭﹻﮟ,) – "This Is Not Us!"

Ali Moeen wrote the lyrics for "Yeh Hum Naheen", a peace song sung by Pakistan's leading artists as part of an international campaign against terrorism. The song and message behind it have been covered by international media.

The campaign was the brainchild of Waseem Mahmood, author and media consultant, who took inspiration for the project from his children, who were tired of the way a minority of misguided young people were putting forward a message of radicalisation and terrorism which was at odds with what the majority of Muslims believe. The central message of the song is that of reconciliation, peace and truth, and is intended as the voice of the silent majority of Pakistanis who are saddened and shocked at the high-jacking of Islam by terrorists, and want to stand up and shout "This is Not Us". "Yeh Hum Naheen" was written in Urdu by a Pakistani artist Ali Moeen in words that are simple and meant to reach a wide-ranging audience.

The music was composed by Shuja Haider. "Yeh Hum Naheen" not only topped MTV Asia and Pakistani charts but also made its presence felt on the British charts.

Books

 Badan Ki Khanqah Se (Urdu Poetry) (1991)
 Bhagwa Bhes (Urdu/Personality Sketches)
 Night Never Ends (English Novel)

 Ham Par Hijr Utar (Urdu Poetry)
 Mujh Main Sooraj Doob Gaya (Urdu Poetry)
 Aitekaf (Urdu Naat)
 Awaz (Urdu poetry)

Drama serials
Ali Moeen wrote several award-winning drama serials.

 Rangbaaz
 Ali Ki Ammi
 Sarmaya
 Noor Mahal
 Baatein dil ki
 Phool waali galli
 Azzal
 Khali Aankhain
 Aik dafa ka zikar hai
 Yeh zindagi – an 18-episode drama serial for ARY Digital
 Makaan Number 47 – a 19-episode comedy serial, ARY Digital
 Mohlat – a 6-episode Indus Vision TV telefilm presented by Gaza Entertainment, produced by Infinity Films
 Marzi (Geo TV)
 Khwaab Nagar Ki Shehzadi
 Mor Moharaan (TV One)

 Jhooti
Jo Bichar Gaye (2021)

Tele films and plays

 Reshman To Jhalli Hai – An Indus Vision TV telefilm by Gaza Entertainment, produced by Infinity Films.
 Rasheed Mechanic Ko Pata Tha – An Indus Vision tele film by Gaaza Entertainment, produced by Infinity Films.
 Aaina Wohi Rehta Hai – A tele film awarded 1st Prize at the Pakistan Television Corporation (PTV) Film Aalmi Adab Se Intikhab Festival (2005)
 Main Hoon – A 2005 New Year special tele film for GEO TV.
 Aik Thee Julia – A tele film for Aaj TV.
 Koi To Ho Ga – A tele film for Aaj TV.
 Daira – A tele film by GEO TV based on the novel Moth Smoke
 Bus Stand – An adaptation of a Manto story telecast from Indus Vision
 Bhook Lag Rahi Hai: A 50-minute, one-scene drama for PTV produced by Evernew Studios and also selected as a NAPA script writing reference
 Khaali Bench – A love story televised on GEO TV.
 Dada Ki Subah – A long play for GEO TV by Imago Films
 Second Chance – A 25 December (Quaid-e-Azam Day) tele film on ARY Digital
 Short Cut – A tele film for Ary Digital starring Moeen Akhtar and Anwar Maqsood
 Gathri – A tele film for IQ Entertainment
 Band Khirki Sey Bahar – A film festival movie
 Matlab Kya ? – 6 September 7, a special Defence Day play for Ary Digital starring Hashim Malik
 Hai Koi…? –  A special 25 December play for Ary Digital
 Radio Wala Ghar – A tele film for ARY Digital
 Ab Kya Karain – A tele film for ARY Digital
 Kya Baat Hai – A 3-episode sitcom, which was a Nida Studios Production for PTV World
 Short Circuit – Comic-Satirical Skits for Pakistan Television Corporation (PTV)
 Eid vs Mobarak – A sitcom long play for PTV
 Raasta – A 13-episode series based on psychological diseases, which was a Target Entertainment & Imago Films joint production and sponsored by Pfizer
 Royals Rescue 15 – A 13-episode Docudrama series, a Nucleus Entertainment Presentation for PTV
 Darwaza – 6-Episode miniseries on psycho-social issues for Indus Vision
 Professor, Vespa Aur Faqeerni
 Main Auraton Say Parda Karna Chahta Hun
 Kyon…! Meray Bhai Ki Shadi Hai
 Qurban Ki Qurbani
 Hakeem Bodla K Teen Betay
 Aik Aadh Hafta – Hum TV Tele Film Festival (2008)
Band Toh Baje Ga (2018) Hum TV
 Aashiq (2019)

Magazine TV shows

 MPO – Tuck-a-Truck Show – Magazine Program. A Writers Bloc presentation produced by Infinity Films
 K2 Ka Challenge – A quiz show by Lakson Tobacco Company, which was a Nucleus Entertainment Production
 Ham Na Manein Haar – A 13-episode magazine show for Unilever Pakistan. It is a MindShare project on Pakistan Television Corporation (PTV)
 Morven Gold Adventure Team – An adventure magazine show set in Bali Indonesia. It was a Nucleus Entertainment Production

 Missing Children Campaign – A Social Project, Nucleus Entertainment Production
 Sky of the East– – Script Rendition for International Grand Prix 2000 Broadcasting Competition, France. Achieved Consolation Prize
 Aik Aur Pehloo – A program on social issues from ARY Digital
 Sangam – A magazine program for ARY Digital

 Naiki – Special IDs – 15 Special IDs on the occasion of Ramazan, ARY Digital
 Cyber Net Calling Mars – produced by I'ON Entertainment for PTV Network
 Buniyad – A concept for rehabilitation of earthquake-stricken areas and people of which 26 episodes have gone on air on ARY Digital
 Baray Log – A magazine show on unsung heroes of Pakistan for ARY Digital

 Documentaries & Corporate Videos: Memon Community – A Journey Through Time on DHL; – The Story of Services, Bank Alfalah – Shahdin Manzil, 23 March; – Aik Tareekhi Sach, 14 August – Pakistan, 11 September; – the Death Anniversary of Quaid-e-Azam, Aao Ahad Karain – A 23 March Documentary

Lyrics and theme songs
 "Sarmaya, Reshman To Jhalli Hai"
 "Rasheed Mechanic Ko Pata Tha"
 "Mohlat"
 "Muqam"
 "Mohabat Ki Pehli Kahani"
 "Maa" (mother)
 "Khaali Aankhain"
 Yeh Hum Naheen ("Peace Song") for GEO TV sung by Sajjad Ali, Ali Azmat, Ahmed Jahanzeb, Fakhir, Fakhar-e-Alam & Ali Haider & Others
 Rangeen, "Chal Rein De"  and Chahar Balish by the musician Sajjad Ali
 Pakistan Mein Pakistan Nahin Milta (2017)

See also
 Yeh Hum Naheen

References

External links
  Yeh Hum Naheen Songwriter
 Yeh Hum Naheen Official webpage
 Infinity Films Website – Awards   archived from original http://www.infinityfilms.com.pk/awards.htm

1968 births
Living people
Government College University, Lahore alumni
Pakistani dramatists and playwrights
Pakistani lyricists
Pakistani screenwriters
People from Lahore